Simon Montagu McBurney  (born 25 August 1957) is an English actor, playwright, and theatrical director. He is the founder and artistic director of the Théâtre de Complicité, London. He has had roles in the films The Manchurian Candidate, Friends with Money, The Last King of Scotland, The Golden Compass, The Duchess, Robin Hood, Harry Potter and the Deathly Hallows – Part 1, Tinker Tailor Soldier Spy, Magic in the Moonlight, The Theory of Everything, and Mission: Impossible – Rogue Nation. He played Cecil the choirmaster in BBC's The Vicar of Dibley.

Early life
McBurney was born in Cambridge, England. His father, Charles McBurney, was an American archaeologist and academic of Scottish descent. His paternal great-grandfather was American surgeon Charles McBurney, who was credited with describing the medical sign McBurney's point. Simon McBurney's mother, Anne Francis Edmondstone (née Charles), was a British secretary of English, Scottish and Irish ancestry. His parents were distant cousins who met during World War II. His older brother is composer and writer Gerard McBurney.

He studied English literature at Peterhouse, Cambridge, graduating in 1980. After his father died, he moved to Paris and trained for the theatre at the Jacques Lecoq Institute.

Career
 McBurney is a founder and artistic director of the UK-based theatre company Complicite, which performs throughout the world. In 1997 he was awarded the Europe Prize Theatrical Realities, with the Théâtre de Complicité. He directed their productions of Street of Crocodiles (1992); The Three Lives of Lucie Cabrol (1994), which was adapted from the John Berger trilogy Into Their Labors; To the Wedding (another Berger collaboration); Mnemonic (1999); The Elephant Vanishes (2003); A Disappearing Number (2007); A Dog's Heart (2010); The Master and Margarita (2011), and The Kid Stays in the Picture (2017).

A Disappearing Number was a devised piece conceived and directed by McBurney, taking as its inspiration the story of the collaboration between two of the 20th century's most remarkable pure mathematicians, the Indian genius Srinivasa Ramanujan, and Cambridge don G.H. Hardy. It played at the Barbican in autumn 2008 and toured internationally. In February 2009, McBurney directed the Complicite production Shun-kin, based on two texts by Jun'ichiro Tanizaki. It was produced in London and Tokyo in 2010.

On a freelance basis, McBurney directed the following: The Resistible Rise of Arturo Ui and All My Sons (2008) (both in New York City), and live comedy shows, including Lenny Henry's So Much Things To Say and French and Saunders' Live in 2000.

McBurney is an established screen actor. He played the recurring role of Cecil the choirmaster in The Vicar of Dibley, CIA computer whiz Garland in Body of Lies, Dr. Atticus Noyle in The Manchurian Candidate (2004), British diplomat Nigel Stone in The Last King of Scotland, the metrosexual husband Aaron in Friends with Money, Fra Pavel in The Golden Compass, Charles James Fox in The Duchess, and Oliver Lacon in Tinker Tailor Soldier Spy. He also wrote the story and was an executive producer for Mr. Bean's Holiday.

From 2010 to 2014, he appeared in the BBC comedy television series Rev., portraying the role of Archdeacon Robert. McBurney provided the voice of Kreacher in Harry Potter and the Deathly Hallows – Part 1 (2010). In the series The Borgias, he portrayed the canon law expert Johannes Burchart. He is the Artiste Associé of the 66th Festival d'Avignon (2012). He starred in The Encounter, about photographer Loren McIntyre becoming lost in the Javari Valley in Brazil and his experiences with locals, which premiered at the 2015 Edinburgh International Festival. In July 2015, he starred as Atlee, the director of MI6 in the film Mission: Impossible – Rogue Nation, and in 2016, he portrayed paranormal investigator Maurice Grosse in the horror film sequel The Conjuring 2.

In September 2019, the Complicité production of The Encounter was ranked by The Guardian writers as the 13th best theatre show since 2000.

Personal life
In 2007, he met concert pianist Cassandra "Cassie" Yukawa. They have since married, and reside in Stroud, Gloucestershire, with their three children, having previously lived in north London. His sister-in-law is violinist Diane Yukawa.

In the 2005 New Year Honours, McBurney was appointed Officer of the Order of the British Empire (OBE) "for services to Drama". He is an Ambassador for Survival International, the global movement for tribal peoples' rights.

Filmography

Film

Television

Accolades
 1997: Europe Prize Theatrical Realities (with the Théâtre de Complicité)
 1998: Laurence Olivier Award (Best Choreography for "The Caucasian Chalk Circle" ("Der kaukasische Kreidekreis"), Royal National Theatre, Olivier Stage, London)
 1999: Critics' Circle Theatre Award (Best new play for "Mnemonic" at the Riverside Theatre)
 2005: Officer of the Order of the British Empire, "New Years Honours List" of Queen Elizabeth II.
 2007: Nestroy Theatre Prize (nomination Best Directing for "A Disappearing Number" at the Wiener Festwochen)
 2007: Critics' Circle Theatre Award (Best new play for "A Disappearing Number" at the Théâtre de Complicité)
 2008: Konrad Wolf Prize

References

External links
 
 
 Profile: Simon McBurney at The Guardian
 American Theatre Wing's Working in the Theatre Episode on Solo Performance featuring McBurney

1957 births
Living people
English dramatists and playwrights
English male film actors
English male stage actors
English male television actors
English people of American descent
English people of Scottish descent
English people of Irish descent
English male Shakespearean actors
English theatre directors
Laurence Olivier Award winners
People from Cambridge
Alumni of Peterhouse, Cambridge
Officers of the Order of the British Empire
Male actors from Cambridgeshire
20th-century English male actors
21st-century English male actors
Theatre practitioners
L'École Internationale de Théâtre Jacques Lecoq alumni